Sultan Syarif Kasim II International Airport , is an international airport that serves the city of Pekanbaru, Riau, Indonesia. The airport is often referred to as SSK II, SSK or Sultan Syarif Qasim II International Airport (SSQ II), and formerly known as Simpang Tiga Airport. The namesake of the airport is Sultan Syarif Kasim II (1893–1968), the last sultan of Siak and an Indonesian National Hero. The airport serves flights to and from several cities and towns in Indonesia and some countries such as Malaysia, Singapore, Sri Lanka, and Saudi Arabia.

The airport area and runway is also shared with Roesmin Nurjadin Air Force Base, a Type A airbase of the TNI-AU (Indonesian Air Force). The airbase is named after the former Chief of Indonesian Air Force, Cmdr. Roesmin Nurjadin. Starting in early December 2014, it served as the homebase of 16 F-16 squadrons upon completion, the additional squadron which is Skadron Udara 16, comprising a fleet of F-16 Blok 52RI and existing Skadron Udara 12 Black Panthers, comprising a fleet of Hawk Mk.109s and Mk.209s.

History

The colonial era Simpang Tiga airport was a disc-shaped landing field about a kilometer west of the current runway. At that time, the area was called the "cornerstone of the Air" where "The foundation of the Air" in which the foundation is still made up of the compacted and hardened soil and was used as a military base. Originally the foundation was redone from the east to the west with the runway numbers 14 and 32. During the Japanese occupation, the airfield was home to a small squadron of airplanes from the Imperial Japanese Army Air Force, before being taken over by the Allies.

The airfield was a transit stop on KNILM's Batavia to Medan or Batavia to Singapore route. After the independence of Indonesia, the newly created  Garuda Indonesian Airways also served Pekanbaru from Jakarta via Padang or Palembang.

In the early days of independence, the current runway was built adjacent to the old airfield. At first it was only 800 meters long numbered 18 and 36. In 1950 the runway was extended to 1,500 meters, and in 1967 the runway and aircraft parking ramp was paved with asphalt to a thickness of 7 cm and the length of the 500-meter runway. In early 2010, the first phase of the airport's expansion started with the construction of a new terminal to replace the original terminal built in the 1980s. The original terminal was demolished to make way for additional parking spaces. The new terminal is constructed in a modern design concept with three jetways and a larger apron.

New terminal

On 16 July 2012, a Rp 2 trillion ($212 million) new terminal has been opened to accommodate 1.5 million passengers a year and serve eight narrow-bodied jets equivalent to Boeing 737-900ER aircraft and wide body jets equivalent to two Boeing 747 jumbo jets at the same time. The new terminal spans 17,000 square meters, and a more spacious aircraft apron can accommodate 10 wide-body aircraft, twice the capacity of the old apron. The new terminal is designed with a mix of Malay and modern architecture. The physical form of the building is inspired from the typical flying fauna form of Riau, Serindit birds. To meet the technical requirements of a world-class airport, the airport runway is extended from 2,200 meters to 2,600 meters and then to 3,000 meters and runway width extension from 30 m to 45 m. Expansion of the airport is part of infrastructure development in support of the 2012 Pekan Olahraga Nasional which was held in Pekanbaru. Despite the opening of the new terminal in 2012, two out of the three jet bridges commenced operation in late July 2014. The airport has now four jet bridges.

The old terminal has been demolished to make way for a new apron. In addition, the new Air traffic control tower (ATC) at Sultan Syarif Kasim II Airport has been developed as to assist the operation of the new airport terminal.

Airport facilities

VIP room
VIP lounge is located on the eastern side the terminal of Sultan Syarif Kasim II Airport. VIP lounge is personified to cater the special guests such as presidents, governmental people, ambassadors and others. In 2012, the airport's VIP room was awarded as the best VIP Room by PT Angkasa Pura II.

Executive lounge
The Lembayung Executive Lounge provides a cozy and comfortable area, specially designated for passengers who are waiting for flights. It can be accessed by passengers who have credit cards issued by several multinational banks in Indonesia who collaborate with the airport.

Terminal
The current terminal was equipped with various facilities including an ATM center, post office, clinics, money changer, and others. Shopping outlets and retailers include a food court, grocery shops, souvenir stands and fashion stores (including Batik Keris, Keris Toys & Bookshop, Kondang Art & Craft, Polo Store).  Restaurants include A&W Restaurant, Bakso Lapangan Tembak Senayan, CFC Restaurant, Starbucks Coffee, Excelso Coffee, KFC, Rotiboy, Roti O, Solaria Cafe, and the local coffee-shop franchise Kimteng Coffee.

Future planning

SSK II airport development was initialized in June 2013 and was expected to be completed in 2014. It was planned upon completion to have a 58,410 square meter apron which would accommodate up to 13 narrowbody aircraft equivalent to Boeing 737-900ER, but can also serve widebody jets equivalent to Airbus A330, Boeing 747, and Boeing 777 aircraft. Some developments include the parallel runway. In addition to runway expansion, PT Angkasa Pura II will also develop the extension of the passenger terminal that can accommodate up to eight million passengers per year as well as the future development of the jet bridges into seven jet bridges from the initial three bridges. Henceforth, this airport is initially planned to accommodate Haj embarkation, especially for Riau Province and particularly Pekanbaru.

Awards
In 2012, the airport's VIP room was awarded as the best VIP Room by PT Angkasa Pura II. The Indonesia Ministry of Culture and Tourism awarded the airport The Cleanest Airport Toilet consecutively in 2012 and 2013. In 2013, the airport was once again awarded as The Best Airport by PT Angkasa Pura II at Bandara Award 2013, held by The Indonesia's Ministry of Culture and Tourism; it beat several prominent airports such as Soekarno–Hatta International Airport in Jakarta, Minangkabau International Airport in Padang and many other airports that are managed under PT Angkasa Pura II.

Airlines and destinations

Passenger

Cargo

Statistics and traffic

Traffic

Statistics

Accidents
 On 28 April 1981, Douglas C-47A PK-OBK of Airfast Indonesia crashed on approach whilst on a non-scheduled passenger flight. Nine of the 17 people on board were killed.
 On 29 September 1999, a Mandala Airlines Antonov AN-12 touched down 1300 meters short of runway 36 and broke in two. There were no fatalities.
 On 14 January 2002, Lion Air Flight 386, a Boeing 737-200, crashed on take-off and was written off; no one died.
 On 14 February 2011, Lion Air Flight 392 overran the runway in Sultan Syarif Qasim II International Airport, Pekanbaru. There were no fatalities or injuries. The plane tried to land three times but failed. On 15 February 2011 another Lion Air plane overshot the runway. Concerned about the two incidents, the Transportation Ministry has banned all Boeing 737-900 ER planes from landing at Sultan Syarif Qasim II airport when the runway is wet. Lion Air will obey the ban and will replace the planes with smaller Boeing 737-400 planes.

References

External links

 PT Angkasa Pura II info on Sultan Syarif Kasim II
  

Pekanbaru
Airports in Riau
Indonesian Air Force bases